The Dream of Water (in Persian : Khab-e Ab) is a 2016 Iranian drama film directed by Farhad Mehranfar. It has been shot in the desert areas of Mehriz/Yazd in Iran, and more than half of the film takes place in the underground labyrinth of ancient step wells. It premiered at the Iran International Green Film Festival (IIGFF).

Plot 
After the breakdown of his car in the desert, a young man who works for the water supply organization reaches an abandoned village. With the help of an old man who is also the remaining inhabitant of that region, he goes down the aqueduct. The old man's condition to get him out is finding the spring that he believes is hidden somewhere beneath the ground.

Reception 
It has been nominated for the best film and the best director in 5th Iran International Green Film Festival in May 2016.

It was screened in 21st Busan International Film Festival, in the Window on Asian Cinema section.

References

External links

2016 films
2016 drama films
Iranian drama films
Iranian independent films
2010s Persian-language films
2016 independent films